Waldmann disease is a rare disease  characterized by enlargement of the lymph vessels supplying the lamina propria of the small intestine. Although its prevalence is unknown, it being classified as a "rare disease" means that less than 200,000 of the population of the United States are affected by this condition and its subtypes.

Signs and symptoms
Signs and symptoms of the disease include diarrhea, nausea, swelling of the legs, protein-losing enteropathy, immunodeficiency and loss of lymphatic fluid into the intestines. It is usually diagnosed before the patient is 3 years old, but it is sometimes diagnosed in adults.

Pathophysiology 
The illness is usually caused by lymphatic vessels that were misshaped at birth, causing obstruction and subsequent enlargement. The condition can also be a result of other illnesses such as constrictive pericarditis and pancreatitis.

Diagnosis
The disease is diagnosed by doing a biopsy of the affected area. Severity of the disease is then determined by measuring alpha1-antitrypsin proteins in a stool sample.

Management
Once the main cause of the disease is treated, a diet of low-fat and high-protein aliments, supplemental calcium and certain vitamins has been shown to reduce symptom effects. This diet, however, is not a cure. If the diet is stopped, the symptoms will eventually reappear.

History
The disease was first reported in 1961 by T.A. Waldmann. He described 18 cases of patients having a low level 131I-albumin.  Biopsies of the small intestine were examined under the microscope and found various levels of dilatation of the lymph vessels.

References

External links 

Rare diseases
Lymphatic vessel diseases